Bodak may refer to
Bodak (surname)
Bodak (Dungeons & Dragons), a monster in table-top game Dungeons & Dragons
Bodak Yellow, a single by the American rapper Cardi B